Try Not to Freak Out is the debut album of the Norwegian punk pop band Sløtface. Just like their former EPs, this release includes clear political and feminist statements.

Track listing

Personnel 
 Haley Shea – vocals
 Tor-Arne Vikingstad – guitars
 Halvard Skeie Wiencke – percussion
 Lasse Lokøy – bass
 Dan Austin – producer

References

2017 debut albums
Sløtface albums